TopTenWholesale is an online business-to-business marketplace. 
The company is headquartered in Los Angeles, California with offices in Hangzhou, China. The company is led by CEO Jason A. Prescott.

References

Technology companies established in 2011
Companies based in San Diego
Technology companies of the United States
2011 establishments in California
American companies established in 2011
Software companies of the United States